In mathematics, the conjugate of an expression of the form  is  provided that  does not appear in  and . One says also that the two expressions are conjugate.

Complex conjugation is the special case where the square root is

Properties

As

and

the sum and the product of conjugate expressions do not involve the square root anymore.

This property is used for removing a square root from a denominator, by multiplying the numerator and the denominator of a fraction by the conjugate of the denominator (see Rationalisation). Typically, one has

In particular

A corollary property is that the subtraction:

leaves only a term containing the root.

See also 
 Conjugate element (field theory), the generalization to the roots of a polynomial of any degree

Algebra